{{DISPLAYTITLE:C8H11N}}
The molecular formula C8H11N (molar mass: 121.18 g/mol) may refer to:

 Bicyclo(2.2.1)heptane-2-carbonitrile
 Collidines (trimethylpyridines)
 2,3,4-Trimethylpyridine
 2,3,5-Trimethylpyridine
 2,3,6-Trimethylpyridine
 2,4,5-Trimethylpyridine
 2,4,6-Trimethylpyridine 
 3,4,5-Trimethylpyridine
 Dimethylaniline
 Phenethylamine
 1-Phenylethylamine
 Xylidines
 2,3-Xylidine
 2,4-Xylidine
 2,5-Xylidine
 2,6-Xylidine
 3,4-Xylidine
 3,5-Xylidine